The Christene Volkspartij was the first Belgian Christian Democratic political party. The party was founded in 1893 by the Belgian priest Adolf Daens, who was inspired by the papal encyclical Rerum novarum of Pope Leo XIII, issued in 1891.

History
The inaugural meeting was organised in Okegem on 15 April 1893, and was attended by the founders of party, the self-styled Roelanders: Vanlangenhaeke, Van de Velde, De Backer, Lambrecht, Sterck, De Pelsmaecker and Pieter Daens, who was from nearby Aalst. Pieter Daens's brother priest Adolf Daens wrote the party programme which was adopted at the next meeting in July 1893.

Adolf Daens founded the party as an alternative for socialism and the conservative Catholic Party. He emphasized the social problems of the time and linked them to the need for social facilities and also a Flemish political programme, aimed at creating a favourable political climate in Flanders.

His political movement had significant success in the region of Aalst, but was opposed by the (Catholic) elite, and by the Roman Catholic Church. In spite of all opposition the Christene Volkspartij succeeded in gaining representation in the Belgian parliament, with Adolf Daens as its foremost leader. In parliament Daens quickly got into conflict with the conservative Catholic leader Charles Woeste and tried to gain support from the Socialists. During the municipal elections of 1899 the Daensists even cooperated with the Socialists in Brussels. In the same year, Adolf Daens was removed from his office as a priest. When the Christene Volkspartij started to grow and threatened the political power of the Socialists, the latter withheld further cooperation.

After his political career, Daens lived in Aalst where he remained as leader of the movement until his death in June 1907. Daensism had a permanent influence in the arrondissement Aalst and created the foundations of Christian democracy in Belgium.

See also
 Politics of Belgium
 PSC-CVP
 Graves de communi re
 Belgian Labour Party

References
 Elias MR DR H.J. Priester Daens en de christene volkspartij, 1893–1907, Aalst, Dietschland S.V. 1940.
 Th. Luykx and M. Platel, Politieke geschiedenis van België, 2 vol., Kluwer, 1985
 E. Witte, J. Craeybeckx en A. Meynen, Politieke geschiedenis van België, Standaard, 1997
 Priester Daensfonds

Defunct political parties in Belgium
Christian democratic parties in Belgium
Defunct Christian political parties
1893 establishments in Belgium
Political parties established in 1893
Political parties with year of disestablishment missing
Aalst, Belgium
Christian socialist organizations